Orrhammar is a village situated in Flen Municipality, Södermanland County, Sweden with 322 inhabitants in 2005.

References 

Populated places in Södermanland County
Populated places in Flen Municipality